Nicolás Bruno (born 24 February 1989 in Avellaneda) is an Argentine male volleyball player. He was part of the Argentina men's national volleyball team. Bruno competed with the national team at the 2012 Summer Olympics in London, Great Britain and at the 2016 Olympics in Rio, Brazil. He currently plays for Halkbank Ankara.

Clubs

  Buenos Aires Unidos (2012)

Individually

 2019 Pan American Games - Most Valuable Player

See also

 Argentina at the 2012 Summer Olympics

References

1989 births
Living people
Argentine men's volleyball players
Volleyball players at the 2012 Summer Olympics
Olympic volleyball players of Argentina
Volleyball players at the 2011 Pan American Games
Pan American Games bronze medalists for Argentina
Volleyball players at the 2016 Summer Olympics
Pan American Games medalists in volleyball
Sportspeople from Avellaneda
Volleyball players at the 2019 Pan American Games
Medalists at the 2011 Pan American Games
Medalists at the 2019 Pan American Games